Challenge is a 1984 Indian Telugu-language film directed by A. Kodandarami Reddy and produced by K. S. Rama Rao under the Creative Commercials banner. It stars Chiranjeevi, Vijayashanti, Suhasini and Rao Gopal Rao with music composed by Ilaiyaraaja. This film is based on Yandamuri Veerendranath's novel Dabbu to the power of Dabbu. The plot revolves around an unemployed youngster (Chiranjeevi) taking up a challenge of a successful business magnate (Rao) to earn  in five years.

Challenge released on 9 August 1984 and became a critically acclaimed and commercially successful film.

Plot 
Gandhi steals medicine for his mother who is on her deathbed. However, by the time he reaches the hospital, his mother is dead, and he is left without any money to cremate her. Wardboy Prakasam demands money to preserve his mother's corpse in the mortuary.

Business tycoon Ram Mohan Rao rushes to the hospital to have his sick wife cured. Gandhi plays a numerical trick with his daughter Harika. This impresses her and she pays Rs.501/- for his mother's funeral. However, the ward boy takes advantage of his situation and steals that money. After his mother's funeral, Gandhi, left with no home and money and wandering on streets jobless, saves a young woman, Lakshmi from drowning, when she jumps off a bridge.

They both reach Lakshmi's house and Gandhi finds an advertisement in the newspaper for a job. Gandhi understands the trick behind that ad and walks into Ram Mohan Rao's house for an interview. Gandhi gives a tit-for-tat for publishing an ad to fool people and both enter into an argument. When Gandhi says that it is not so difficult to make money and he can make Rs.50 lakhs in five years lawfully, Ram Mohan Rao challenges him that if Gandhi succeeds, he will get his daughter married to him. Both sign an agreement on this and Gandhi leaves on 19 April.

Ram Mohan Rao throws the agreement into a trash bin and forgets this incident, but determined Gandhi starts planning for his 50 lakhs. He wins his first Rs.100, through gambling and explains to Lakshmi, the difference between law and justice and that he won those Rs.100 lawfully. Meanwhile, Ram Mohan Rao tries to make marriage arrangements for his daughter Harika, but Gandhi learns of the incident by the information he received from Harika, Gandhi interrupts and spoils the marriage arrangement explaining that he had bet for a duration of five years with Ram Mohan Rao in which if he succeeds he would marry Harika. While Gandhi is leaving, Ram Mohan Rao sends goons to kill Gandhi, but Gandhi bashes all goons and tells them to inform Ram Mohan Rao that not only he is intelligent but also has the physical power to beat up such goons.

Gandhi slowly progresses and buys a new house and moves in with Lakshmi, who now, is his secretary, Lakshmi gives Gandhi a letter which he must read only after completion of challenge duration of five years regardless of his success or failure in the challenge. Lakshmi's ill-charactered brother Hanumantha Rao enters their house with his wife Priyamvada, pretending to be homeless. Despite Lakshmi's warning, Gandhi lets them stay.

Hanumantha Rao tries every possible trick to defame Gandhi and separate him from Lakshmi and Harika but fails. Also, Priyamvada tries to seduce Gandhi and realizes her mistake through him, at that moment Priyamvada reveals out that her husband Hanumantha Rao is the one who is leaking Gandhi's business secrets to Ram Mohan Rao. Gandhi plans to start a paper mill to compete with Ram Mohan Rao, and accidentally meets a young man named Vidyarthi.

Gandhi learns that Vidyarthi worked for Ram Mohan Rao in the past and uses his experience and talent to promote his business. During his rise, Harika supports him by saving him from going bankrupt and starts adoring him. Hanumantha Rao manages to create problems in Gandhi's paper mill and Lakshmi revolts seeing Gandhi adamant about making money rather than bothering about his workers' welfare. Since the problems in paper mill don't seem to come to an end, Gandhi opts for another plan which is launching a new scooter into the market. Gandhi gets an immense response from the public for his new scooter launch and gets a lot of money in advance booking in the form of cash, cheques and Demand Drafts.

On the last day of the bet, Gandhi is left with Rs.500 short of 50 lakhs and the ward boy, who is influenced by Gandhi's personality and thinking, brings about changes within himself and returns Rs.500. Jubilant, Gandhi tries to reach Ram Mohan Rao but realizes that he is leaving the country with his daughter. On his way to the airport, Gandhi is attacked by Hanumanth Rao and goons. Gandhi bashes them up and reaches Ram Mohan Rao to declare his victory.

When Ram Mohan Rao tries to shoot Gandhi, Gandhi saves himself with the suitcase in his hand, which has all the cash in it. He throws away all the money, during which the letter given by Lakshmi to him falls down at the feet of Harika, he explains to Ram Mohan Rao that there is nothing impossible for a man who has self-confidence and there are few things in this world that money can't buy, like love and self-confidence. Gandhi says that Ram Mohan Rao is so arrogant that when they agreed to the challenge he did not consider his daughter's opinion before agreeing to get his daughter married to Gandhi if Gandhi succeeds. Ram Mohan Rao didn't even mention what Gandhi must give or do if Gandhi fails in the challenge. Meanwhile, Harika reads the letter (which has good wishes to Gandhi from Lakshmi for him to succeed in every matter of his life and expressing her love for him) and hands over it to Gandhi, before he leaves. Gandhi returns to Lakshmi and marries her.

Cast
 Chiranjeevi as Gandhi
 Vijayashanti as Harika
 Suhasini as Lakshmi
 Rao Gopal Rao as Rammohan Rao
 Gollapudi Maruti Rao as Hanumantha Rao
 Rajendra Prasad as Vidyarthi
 Allu Aravind in a cameo appearance
 P. Sai Kumar as Ward boy Prakasam
 Silk Smitha as Priyamvada

Soundtrack

Music was composed by Maestro Ilaiyaraaja. Lyrics were written by Veturi. Music released on ECHO Audio Company.

Reception
The film received positive reviews and became a commercial success.

References

External links 
 Movie Review at iqlik 
 

1980s Telugu-language films
1984 films
Films directed by A. Kodandarami Reddy
Films scored by Ilaiyaraaja
Films based on novels by Yandamuri Veerendranath
Films based on Indian novels